John Grider Miller (born 23 August 1935 in Annapolis, Maryland – died 31 August 2009 in Annapolis, Maryland) was a colonel in the United States Marine Corps, who served as managing editor of U.S. Naval Institute Proceedings and of Naval History.

Career

After graduating from Yale in 1957, Miller was commissioned in the Marine Corps.  He was an infantry officer, commanded a U. S. Marine battalion, and served as an advisor to the Republic of Vietnam Marine Corps during the Vietnam War. Later in his career, he was Deputy Director of the Marine Corps' History and Museums Division and was a speechwriter to three Commandant of the Marine Corps.

He joined the United States Naval Institute staff on 19 September 1985 and  served until 31 August 2000, becoming managing editor of Proceedings and  Naval History Magazine, the latter of which he had helped to establish in 1988.

He wrote several books of which the best known is The Bridge at Dong Ha, the story of Navy Cross recipient John Ripley (USMC).

Recognition

Military decorations

Other awards

 Alfred Thayer Mahan Award for Literary Achievement, 2002.
 Brigadier General Robert L. Denig Memorial Distinguished Performance Award, 2009.

Published books
 The Battle to save the Houston, October 1944 to March 1945.  Annapolis: Naval Institute Press, 1985; 2000.
 The bridge at Dong Ha. Annapolis, Md.: Naval Institute Press, 1989.
 Punching out: launching a post-military career by Fred Mastin with John Grider Miller. New York: St. Martin’s Press, 1994.
 The co-vans: U.S. Marine advisors in Vietnam. Annapolis, Md.: Naval Institute Press, 2000.

1935 births
2009 deaths
Writers from Annapolis, Maryland
American naval historians
American male non-fiction writers
American military writers
Yale University alumni
United States Marine Corps colonels
United States Marine Corps personnel of the Vietnam War
Recipients of the Legion of Merit
Burials at Arlington National Cemetery
Military personnel from Maryland
20th-century American male writers
20th-century American non-fiction writers
Historians from Maryland